In Mexican cuisine, Menudo, also known as pancita ([little] gut or [little] stomach) or mole de panza ("stomach sauce"), is a traditional Mexican soup, made with cow's stomach (tripe) in broth with a red chili pepper base. Hominy, lime, onions, and oregano are used to season the broth.

Cultural significance
Menudo is traditionally prepared by the entire family, and often serves as an occasion for social interactions such as after wedding receptions where the families of the newlyweds go to one of their family's houses to enjoy a bowl of menudo before and after the ceremony. It is also believed to be a hangover cure.

Menudo takes a long time to prepare as the tripe takes hours to cook. It includes many ingredients and side dishes (such as salsa), and is garnished with chopped onions, chiles, cilantro, and often with lime juice; it is often prepared communally and eaten at a feast. 

Documents from the American Works Progress Administration indicate that in the 1930s, among migrant workers in Arizona, menudo parties were held regularly to celebrate births, Christmas, and other occasions.

Preparation

Four to seven hours' cooking is required. Beef tripe sellers offer a version of this meat that has been boiled in hot water, which reduces cooking time by hours. In its simplest form, beef tripe is rinsed then boiled for three hours in a large pot with half an onion to remove the strong odor of the tripe. It is then removed from the pot, discarding the onion half, and allowed to cool before being cut into strips, or occasionally diced.  The water is discarded, then the tripe is returned to the pot with fresh water, oregano, red chili paste or powder, lime or lemon juice, hominy, and this is boiled.

The dish is typically served with chopped raw onions, oregano, diced chiles (usually serrano), and lemon or lime segments along with corn or flour tortillas.

It almost always includes tripe, and some versions of the dish in Mexico also include honeycomb and librillo beef along with the feet and tendons. Versions of the dish that include meats other than tripe have a much longer cooking time. Pig's trotters are also used in northern-style menudo, such as in Chihuahua. The feet and tendons are boiled first at low-to-medium heat for about three hours. The tripe is then added with salt, a half onion, and one or two heads of garlic. Red menudo also includes guajillo chili paste. The menudo is boiled for a further three hours while covered.  Once it is almost done, the hominy is added.

Regional variations

There are a number of regional variations on menudo. In northern Mexico, hominy is typically added. In northwest states such as Sinaloa and Sonora usually only the blanco, (white) variation is seen; menudo blanco is the same dish, but red pepper is not added (though jalapeño or chopped green chilies may be included to replace the spice in the red version), thus giving the broth a clear or white color. Adding patas (beef or pig's feet) to the stew is popular in the United States. In some areas of central Mexico, "menudo" refers to a stew of sheep stomach, pancitas stew of beef tongue. In south-western Mexico (in and around the Distrito Federal, Morelos, and Guerrero) it is called panza or panza guisada. The red variation is usually seen in the northern state of Chihuahua and Nuevo León . Only yellow hominy is usually used in menudo in Texas. A similar stew made with more easily cooked meat is pozole. Some variations of menudo substitute garbanzo beans instead of hominy.

Menudo in the United States

In the United States, since the mid-20th century, prepared menudo has been common in food stores and restaurants in cosmopolitan areas and in other areas with a significant Mexican population. Restaurants often feature it as a special on Saturday and Sunday, and some believe menudo alleviates hangovers. Canned menudo is also available.

An annual Menudo Festival is held in Santa Maria, California. In 2009, more than 2,000 people attended and 13 restaurants competed for prizes in three categories. The festival is organized by the National Latino Peace Officers Association of Northern Santa Barbara County and the money raised goes toward scholarships for local students.

Since 1996, the Menudo Bowl is an annual event in Laredo, Texas. In 2019, over 30 teams participated to make the best menudo. The event is organized by Laredo Crime Stoppers, with teams conformed by public officials, law enforcement, media representatives, and members of the community. The event is attended by people from both sides of the US–Mexico border.

Gallery

See also 

 Sopa de mondongo
 Trippa a la Romana
 Callos a la Madrileña
 Tripes à la mode de Caen
 Flaki
 İşkembe çorbası
 List of Mexican dishes
 List of soups
 Californian cuisine

References

External links
 Wikibooks:Cookbook:Menudo
Menudo recipes from the FoodNetwork

Mexican beef dishes
Cuisine of the Western United States
Mexican cuisine
Mexican soups
Offal
Spicy foods
Christmas food
Food and drink in California